Kang Sang-hee (born 7 March 1998) is a South Korean footballer currently playing as a defender for FC Seoul.

Club career
Kang Sang-heen joined FC Seoul in 2020.

On 14 June 2020, Kang debuted in K League 1.

Career statistics

Club

References

External links
 

1998 births
Living people
South Korean footballers
Association football defenders
K League 1 players
FC Seoul players